Insulation may refer to:

Thermal
 Thermal insulation, use of materials to reduce rates of heat transfer
 List of insulation materials
 Building insulation, thermal insulation added to buildings for comfort and energy efficiency
 Insulated siding, home siding that includes rigid foam insulation
 Insulated glazing, a thermally insulating window construction
 Insulated pipe, widely used for district heating and hot water supply in Europe
 Insulated shipping container, a type of packaging used to ship temperature-sensitive products

Electrical
 Insulator (electricity), the use of material to resist the electric current and magnetism
 Insulating link, a device used on the hook of a crane
 Insulation system, for wires used in generators, electric motors, transformers
 Myelination, electrical insulation of nerve cells

Other uses
 Soundproofing, also known as acoustic insulation, any means of reducing the intensity of sound
 Insulated neighborhood, chromosomal loop structures

See also
 Insolation or solar irradiance
 Insulator (disambiguation)
 Isolation (disambiguation)